was a Japanese volleyball player, who was also a member of the Japan men's national volleyball team and of Toray Arrows.

Personal life
Naonobu Fujii grew up in Miyagi, Japan where he attended Furukawa Industrial High School, a school known for its volleyball team. Gaining an interest in the sport, he went on to play for Juntendo University. He enjoyed outdoor activities such as cycling in his free time.

His family home was swept away by tsunami caused by Tohoku earthquake . Because of the disaster, his father was unemployed by that time. Fujii once was forced to the situation that he may need to give up his dream of playing volleyball. With his family's encouragement, Fujii continued his volleyball dream.

In September 2021, Fujii announced that he had married Miya Sato, who was a setter of the Japan women's national volleyball team and Hitachi Rivale club.

On February 27, 2022, Fujii announced that he has been diagnosed with Stage IV Stomach Cancer, which had metastasized to his brain.

Fujii died from stomach cancer on March 10, 2023, at the age of 31. JVA sent out their condolences to his family and the Japanese volleyball community mourned his loss.

Career
After college Fujii went on to join the Torray Arrows team as a setter. Starting in the 2016–17 season, he was selected for the Japan men's national volleyball team where he played as number 3. In 2021, he was one of the Japanese men's national team roster, which competed in 2020 Summer Olympics, and the team finished in 7th place after 29 years.

Awards

Individual
 2017 Asian Men's Volleyball Championship- Best Setter

Club teams 
2016/2017 V.Premier League Men's – Best 6, with Torray Arrows

References

External links
Player profile on 2017 World League Page
Player profile on Toray Arrows Page

1992 births
2023 deaths 
Deaths from stomach cancer
Japanese men's volleyball players
Sportspeople from Miyagi Prefecture
Juntendo University alumni
Volleyball players at the 2020 Summer Olympics
Olympic volleyball players of Japan
Setters (volleyball)